The women's team of five competition at the 2006 Asian Games in Doha was held on 7 and 8 December 2006 at Qatar Bowling Centre.

Schedule
All times are Arabia Standard Time (UTC+03:00)

Results

References 

Results at ABF Website
Results

External links
Official Website

Women's team